Giorgio Bronzini (born 20 April 1990) is a retired Italian rugby union player. His usual position was a scrum-half and he currently is named coach for Viadana Academy.

From 2016 to 2019 he played with Italian Pro14 team Benetton.

From 2013 to 2016 Bronzini was named with Emerging Italy and in 2016 with Italy squad. He represented Italy on 10 occasions in 2016.
In 2018 he played also with Italy Sevens.

References

External links
Treviso Profile
Pro12 Profile
It's Rugby Profile

1990 births
Living people
Italian rugby union players
Italy international rugby union players
Rugby union scrum-halves
Sportspeople from the Province of Mantua
Aironi players
Italy international rugby sevens players
Benetton Rugby players
Rugby Viadana players
Rugby Rovigo Delta players